The Marlbrook Marl is a geologic formation in Arkansas.  It preserves fossils dating back to the Cretaceous period.

Paleofauna

Ostracods

Alatacythere
A. pondersana
Amphicytherura
A. dubia
Bairda
Bairdoppilata
B. pondera
Brachycythere
B. ledaforma
B. ovata
B. rhomboidalis
Bythocypris
B. windhami
Clithrocytheridea
C. fabaformis
Cythereis
C. costatana
C. hannai

Cytherella
C. coryelli
C. navarroensis
C. scotti
Cytherelloidea
C. austinensis
C. crafti
C. greenensis
C. spiralia
C. tollettensis
Cytheris
C. communis
C. costatana
C. filicosta
C. pidgeoni
C. tuberculifera
C. verricula
Cytheropteron
C. blakei
C. castorensis
C. harrisi

Echinocythereis
E. bartoni
Haplocytheridea
H. bruceclarki
H. councilli
H. fabaformis
H. globosa
H. micropunctata
H. monmouthensis
H. plummeri
Krithe
K. cushmani
K. swaini
Loxoconcha
L. fletcheri
Monoceratina
M. marssonitina
M. montuosa
M. pedata
M. prothroensis

Morrowina
Neocythere
N. (Neocythere) pseudoconcentrica
Orthonotacythere
O. (Orthonotacythere) hannai
O. (Orthonotacythere) polita
Paracypris
P. angusta
P. goodlandensis
Pterygocythere
P. saratogana
Trachyleberis
T. communis
T. pideoni
Veenia
V. arachoides
V. ozanana
Xestoleberis
X. opina

Avians
Hesperornis

See also

 List of fossiliferous stratigraphic units in Arkansas
 Paleontology in Arkansas

References

 

Cretaceous Arkansas